Live at the Fillmore East March 7, 1970: It's About that Time is a live double album by Miles Davis.  Sony Music Entertainment released the album in 2001, although the concert had previously circulated as a bootleg recording.  The March 7, 1970 concert consisted of two sets, each of which is presented on one compact disc.

Live at the Fillmore East records the final concert with saxophonist Wayne Shorter in Davis' band.  At the same time, it is one of the first recordings (along with the 1969 Miles Festiva De Juan Pins) to document Davis' use of electric instruments in a concert setting.  Davis performed on the nights of March 6 and 7 at Fillmore East; Columbia Records recorded both nights' concerts, but as of 2008 has only released the March 7 show. A number of the compositions performed during the concert appear on Bitches Brew, which had not yet been released at the time of this concert.

These performances were as support to Neil Young and Crazy Horse and the Steve Miller Band. Young's performance has also been released as a live album.

Track listing 
All compositions by Miles Davis unless otherwise indicated.
CD 1 (first set)
 "Directions" (Joe Zawinul) – 8:44
 "Spanish Key" – 11:16
 "Masqualero" (Wayne Shorter) – 9:57
 "It's About That Time/The Theme" – 14:03
 It's About That Time - 13:24
 The Theme - 0:40

CD 2 (second set)
 "Directions" (Joe Zawinul) – 10:14
 "Miles Runs the Voodoo Down" – 7:40
 "Bitches Brew" – 8:02
 "Spanish Key" – 8:33
 "It's About That Time/Willie Nelson" – 11:42
 It's About That Time - 0:56
 Willie Nelson - 9:37
 The Theme - 1:12

Personnel 
Musicians
 Miles Davis - trumpet
 Wayne Shorter - soprano and tenor saxophone
 Chick Corea - Fender Rhodes electric piano
 Dave Holland - acoustic and electric bass
 Jack DeJohnette - drums
 Airto Moreira - percussion, cuica

Production
Original Recordings Produced by Teo Macero
Concert Produced by Bill Graham
Produced for Release by Bob Belden
Recorded by Stan Tonkel
Mixed by Richard King
Mastered by Mark Wilder, Seth Foster
Art direction: Howard Fritzson
Design: Alice Butts
Cover photo: Amalie R. Rothschild

Charting history

References 

Live at the Fillmore East albums
Albums produced by Teo Macero
Miles Davis live albums
2001 live albums
Columbia Records live albums